Jack O. Bovender Jr. is the former chairman and CEO of Hospital Corporation of America from 2002 to 2009.

Early life and career
Bovender was born on  August 16, 1945 in Winston-Salem, North Carolina.  He attended high school in King, North Carolina. He began his career in hospital administration as a U.S. Navy lieutenant stationed at the Naval Medical Center Portsmouth. He continued to work in the health care industry until his retirement in 2009 from Hospital Corporation of America.

Bovender is the retired chairman and CEO of Nashville-based Hospital Corporation of America.  HCA owns and operates approximately 160 hospitals and 100 surgery centers in the United States and England. He became president and CEO in 1992, and he served as chairman and CEO from 2002 to 2009. Additionally, he is a founding member of the Nashville Health Care Council and serves on the boards of several human service and arts organizations.

Bovender graduated from Duke University in 1967, with a B.A. in psychology and in 1969 with a Master of Health Administration.  Bovender has served on the Fuqua School of Business Board of Visitors for several years.  He is a former member of Duke Divinity School's board of visitors and former chairman of the Duke University Divinity School's capital campaign committee.  He has also served on the executive committee of the Duke Annual Fund.  He is currently a member of the university's board of trustees, serving as vice chair of the board, chair of the audit committee, vice chair of the business and finance committee, and a member of the executive committee.

He was named by Institutional Investor magazine as "Best CEO in America" for healthcare facilities in 2003, 2004 and 2005.

Philanthropy
Bovender and his wife donated $25 million to Duke in 2011.

Personal Life
Bovender is married to his wife, Barbara, and has one son, Richard.

References

HCA Healthcare people
American health care chief executives
Duke University Trinity College of Arts and Sciences alumni
Duke University faculty
Living people
People from Nashville, Tennessee
People from Winston-Salem, North Carolina
Year of birth missing (living people)
1945 births